Alfonso de la Cerda, O.P. (died June 25, 1592) was a Roman Catholic prelate who served as Bishop of La Plata o Charcas (1587–1592) and Bishop of Comayagua (1578–1587).

Biography
Alfonso de la Cerda was born in Caceres, Spain and moved to the United States to make a living but - discouraged by the morality of his fellow migrants - he left and entered the convent of San Rosario in Lima where he was ordained a priest in the Order of Preachers in 1545. He was elected prior of the convents of Porto Bello, Arequipa, and Lima, and then preacher-general of Peru, and finally provincial of Peru where he established a requirement that all missionaries have some knowledge of Indian languages. In 1573, he was sent to Rome to represent the interests of the Dominicans of Peru. On January 13, 1578, he was appointed by the King of Spain and confirmed by Pope Gregory XIII as Bishop of Comayagua. On November 6, 1587, he was appointed by the King of Spain and confirmed by Pope Sixtus V as Bishop of La Plata o Charcas. In 1588, he founded a convent of his order in Chuquisaca. He served as Bishop La Plata o Charcas until his death on June 25, 1592, in Chuquisaca.

References

External links and additional sources
 (for Chronology of Bishops) 
 (for Chronology of Bishops) 
 (for Chronology of Bishops) 
 (for Chronology of Bishops) 

1592 deaths
Bishops appointed by Pope Gregory XIII
Bishops appointed by Pope Sixtus V
Dominican bishops
Roman Catholic bishops of Comayagua
Roman Catholic bishops of Sucre